Streptomyces flavotricini is a bacterium species from the genus of Streptomyces which has been isolated from mountain forest soil. Streptomyces flavotricini produces bafilomycin K and aminoacylase.

See also 
 List of Streptomyces species

References

Further reading

External links
Type strain of Streptomyces flavotricini at BacDive -  the Bacterial Diversity Metadatabase

flavotricini
Bacteria described in 1958